Whatcom Glacier is in North Cascades National Park in the U.S. state of Washington, in a cirque to the northeast of Whatcom Peak.

See also
List of glaciers in the United States

References

Glaciers of the North Cascades
Glaciers of Skagit County, Washington
Glaciers of Washington (state)